Jesper Svenbro (born 10 March 1944) is a Swedish poet, classical philologist, and member of the Swedish Academy.

Biography 
Svenbro was born in Landskrona, Scania, Sweden. He was educated at Lund University, where he was awarded a Ph.D. in 1976 for his dissertation , on the origin of ancient Greek poetics. Other works include :  (1988). He is director of research at Centre Louis Gernet (CRCSA) in Paris. In 2006, he was elected a member of the Swedish Academy, succeeding the poet Östen Sjöstrand in seat 8.

His poetry has been translated into English by the Swedish critic Lars-Håkan Svensson and the American poet John Matthias, and appearing, among other venues, in the journal Samizdat and the volume The Three-Toed Gull: Selected Poems, published by Northwestern University Press. In 2010, Svenbro was awarded the Illis quorum in the eighth size by the Swedish government.

Bibliography
  (1966)
  (1976)
  (1979)
  (1984)
  :  (1988)
  (1988)
  (1991)
  (1991)
 
  (1994)
  (1996)
  (1999)
 Lepidopterology (1999)
  (1999)
  (2001)
  (2002)
  (2002)
  (2005)
  (2006)
  (2007)
  (2008)
  (2011)
  (2011)
  =  (2011)
  (2013)
 Hill, Hill, Hill (2014)
  (2015)
  (2015)

References
Jesper Svenbro, official presentation at Centre Louis Gernet
"SvD:s litteraturpristagare pendlar mellan samtiden och antiken", interview in Svenska Dagbladet, 28 November 2005.
"Nya ledamöter i Svenska Akademien", official press release from the Swedish Academy

1944 births
Living people
People from Landskrona Municipality
Writers from Scania
Members of the Swedish Academy
Swedish male writers
Swedish-language writers
Hellenists
Recipients of the Illis quorum